Myrmica karavajevi is a workerless, socially parasitic ant species: it is widely distributed across Europe (Ukraine, European Russia, Belarus, Moldova, Hungary, Romania, Estonia, Finland, Sweden, Norway, Poland, the Czech Republic, Germany, Belgium, Austria, Switzerland, England, Italy, France and Spain). It lives in nests of other species (Myrmica scabrinodis and close relatives) that inhabit warm and humid habitats.

References
 Csősz S, Markó B, Gallé L 2011. The myrmecofauna (Hymenoptera: Formicidae) of Hungary: an updated checklist North-Western Journal of Zoology 7: 55–62.
 Czekes Z et al. 2012. The genus Myrmica Latreille, 1804 (Hymenoptera: Formicidae) in Romania: distribution of species and key for their identification Entomologica romanica 17: 29–50.

External links

Hymenoptera of Europe
Myrmica
Insects described in 1930